Tireh (also Romanized as Tīreh; also known as Tīneh) is a village in Fordu Rural District, Kahak District, Qom County, Qom Province, Iran. At the 2006 census, its population was 51, in 13 families.

References 

Populated places in Qom Province